Tempo TV (originally New Channel) was a Greek private television station of nationwide scope, based in Athens. New Channel was the fourth television station in a row to operate in Greece after the launch of Mega Channel, ANT1 and Channel 29.

It got its first name from its namesake owner company. During the Mitsotakis government in the two years 1993-1994, it obtained a temporary television license, valid for seven years (1993-2000), without financial compensation, like all other national television stations.

History

Preparation and first broadcast
A few days before the first broadcasts, the channel is advertised in magazines and newspapers. The station started broadcasting on February 17, 1990 from Thessaloniki as New Channel with its founders Sotiris Kouvelas (who was mayor of Thessaloniki in the period 1986-1989 where he founded the municipal radio and television) and the businessman and then general secretary of the Ministry for the Environment, Physical Planning and Public Works Fotis Manousis.

New Channel was originally the Athenian version of the municipal local initially channel as they had collaborated with each other for a long time, exchanging programs and news bulletins (mainly the short ones) while in the evening the television station was networked with the Municipal Radio of Thessaloniki, FM 100.

The first programs
Then, from a relatively low-key start, New Channel made an effort to gain a larger share of viewership from 1992 onwards, buying and re-launching popular foreign series such as Dynasty, showing Greek series of its own production such as "The Price (To timima)", "Show and harmless (Show kai avlaves)" and "Our police department (To astinomiko mas tmima)", which were not very successful, and stopped after a number of episodes.

In the period 1993-1996, the station starts broadcasting Greek basketball games, specifically from the Greek cup. At the same time the channel broadcast the first show of Makis Triantafyllopoulos entitled Yellow Press (Kitrinos Typos) and the first lifestyle show with artistic news and news about the soubise faces entitled Myths and Reality (Mythoi kai Pragmatikotita) presented by Dimitris Papanotas, who was also the presenter of the station's first news bulletins.

Also, other similar shows were presented by the director Costas Kapetanidis, while Annita Pania with the Golden Sugarplum (Hrisso Koufeto) from Makedonia TV also passed, while at the same time she showed some series of ANT1 in repetition and music videos from the Greek and foreign repertoire. Many well-known names such as Dimitris Konstantaras and Menya Papadopoulou passed through the main bulletin, while the channel did not hesitate to shake the waters of free television with the show "Erotodikio", presented by Vicky Michalonakou together with Petros Leotsakos, Pepi Tsesmeli, Eleni Louka and guests from the "luben" space.

Other well-known shows of the TV station were the trash shows Logodosmenoi and Autophoro with Pepi Tsesmeli, which became identical to the station.

The acquisition and the new era
In December 1999 New Channel tried to become competitive with the other five major private television channels (MEGA, ANT1, STAR, the then newly formed ALPHA and Alter 5) and ERT changed ownership as it was sold to Stabilton S.A. of Michalis Androulidakis, who published the newspapers Exousia and Ependytis respectively, with the purchase agreement to be signed on November 24 of the same year and which Stabilton acquired the Macedonian Spinning Mills.

In March 2000 the station was renamed New Tempo and on October 23 of this year it ended up on Tempo TV. However, the rise of the station's spectacle was not as expected, as he never had much advertising time from the rest of the nationwide television stations, always expecting more commercials, something that led him very quickly to the huge financial problems.

The newly formed Tempo had a strong start in its premiere, as it had a varied program through which the channel was radically upgraded, which was the first in Greece to launch the animated image in its weather report. At the dawn of the new millennium, the then Prime Minister Costas Simitis also attended the inauguration and presentation of the program of the newly established channel that took place at the Hilton Athens. The channel was set up for a very short time by Nikos Evangelatos, who took over the general management and the news department, where he set up a multi-member journalistic team, some of them from ERT, in which his wife Tatiana Stefanidou also participated.

The plan for the then television data, turned out to be short-lived, because the limits were exceeded, reaching the capacity of employing more than 700 employees, at a time when the two former rival private channels MEGA and ANT1 did not have more than 400 employees, while Evangelatos left the channel in November 2001 due to the channel's financial problems and with Liana Kanelli taking over the presentation of the main news bulletin from December 3rd. Earlier on February 15, the publication of the newspaper "Exousia" stopped.

CNN's Turner Broadcasting System then sued Tempo for illegally rebroadcasting news on the network without a contract regarding the September 11 attacks.

The consequences and the end of an era
In 2002, the unprecedented TV data dispute between the unpaid TEMPO employees from the beginning of that year and the ownership of his company started as a result of a crisis at the station, which dates back to the announcement of the first ones from late 2000 with late payment of accruals and in March 2002 the station's management decided to discontinue the news bulletins, a move that was denounced by 66 of its journalists, the Journalists' Union of the Athens Daily Newspapers and the then presenter of the main news bulletin, Liana Kanelli.

The then MP of Synaspismos Panagiotis Lafazanis also spoke, in a relevant question he raised on the issue in Parliament for "radical and harmful change in the terms of employment contracts of dozens of journalists of political and news reporting, who are essentially fired by extortion."

The workers went on strike, filing for precautionary measures. On July 9, and later on September 9 of the same year, they took control of the flow and the building of the canal, airing cards with their demands. Following their lawsuits, the prosecutor prosecuted Androulidakis, who was arrested, and later released on September 2.

On the 13th of the same month, Androulidakis sued 33 employees of the station for, among other things, a "threat to his physical integrity" and "damage to his property", as a result of which the Units for the Reinstatement of Order invaded the premises to be arrested.

In an attempt to prevent the work from being postponed and the flow of the program to be occupied, Androulidakis shut down the transmitters in Athens (22 UHF from Hymettus and 59 UHF from Parnitha) and Thessaloniki (35 UHF from Mount Chortiatis), cutting off the flow from the main facilities to air different from an unknown point by illegally and automatically turning the station from informative to entertaining by playing music video clips and sometimes high charge lines (090) and sexually explicit movies.

Due to these events, the ESR, having previously given September 18th a month to solve the economic problems, decided on October 22nd that the channel should be closed, a decision that is annulled by the Council of State, while earlier the businessman tried to join the "New Channel Broadcasting Co. S.A." where the latter held 25% of its shares in a "special liquidation" status, stating that the company had debts amounting to 43,264,212.77 euros, as was the case with the smaller companies of the Androulidakis Group.

On April 8, 2003, the ESR decided again to shut down the channel, rejecting Androulidakis' proposal for a further deadline, as since the beginning of the year the station has been broadcasting sexually explicit messages and star-studded advertisements, forecasts and preventions and superstitions of the people, while both these messages and these advertisements cause a risk of moral damage to minors and people, something that is prohibited by the Constitution of Greece.

After six months (Friday, October 10, 2003), EETT permanently ceased its most illegal operation by confiscating its equipment, completely losing its national license, since 1993, without ever overcoming its serious financial problems. Then he starts broadcasting in his place a pirate channel called Neo, broadcasting similar content, through the VCA studios, interests of Elias Kopanitsas. His emission was denounced by Androulidakis, and stopped permanently on the 17th of the month, while the VCA later applied for a regional license.

That month saw the dismissal of the latest CEOs of both Tempo and the fledgling Alter Channel, while earlier its ratings were very low (up to 3% with the largest reaching 7%), and Stabilton's stake in the channel had begun to fall.

Availability
The channel had a wide network of frequencies and covered several areas of Greece. When it finally closed due to financial problems in 2003 on its frequencies, the pirate channel "Neo" came out for a very short time, which broadcast only high-charge lines (090) and when it closed, the then proportional frequencies of Tempo, were liberated and occupied over the years in all parts of the country, mainly by various other pirate stations, but also by legal local and regional stations, some of national scope (mainly Seven - today's Skai TV, which at that time did not have national frequencies) including the public channels, but also from a pirate network of TV Chat programs of the company Telecom in the northern part of the country. Tempo TV also broadcast in the first years, until the end of its operation and subscribed through NOVA, which also fed dozens of analogue transponders nationwide. The debt TV channel has been mortgaged to the systematic banks for many years, and it remains unknown what happened to the station as a whole (film library, copyright, equipment, etc.), while it will probably have been destroyed, because it has been down for 20 years, as at the time the channel was broadcasting, the internet was not widespread, and many of its programs (if saved) were written in videotapes.

References

Greek-language television stations
Television channels and stations established in 1990
Television channels and stations disestablished in 2003
1990 establishments in Greece
2003 disestablishments in Greece
Defunct television channels in Greece